Try Hamdani Goentara (born 3 January 1994, in Palembang) is an Indonesian professional footballer who plays as a goalkeeper for Liga 1 club PSS Sleman.

Club career
In 2014, he joined to the main team of Sriwijaya FC. He is also the main Goalkeeper of Sriwijaya FC U-21.

In 2017, he joined to PSS Sleman for Liga 2 He made his debut with PSS Sleman when against Persipura Jayapura in first match 2017 Piala Presiden

Honours

Club
Sriwijaya U-21
 Indonesia Super League U-21: 2012–13
PSS Sleman
 Liga 2: 2018

References

External links
 Try Hamdani at Soccerway
 Try Hamdani at Liga Indonesia

1994 births
Living people
Indonesian footballers
Liga 1 (Indonesia) players
Liga 2 (Indonesia) players
Sriwijaya F.C. players
PSS Sleman players
Persipura Jayapura players
Persita Tangerang players
People from Palembang
Sportspeople from South Sumatra
Association football goalkeepers